John Millington Lomas (12 December 1917 – 4 December 1945) was an English cricketer who played first-class cricket for Oxford University in 1938 and 1939.

Life and career
Lomas was an outstanding schoolboy cricketer at Charterhouse School. He captained the school team in 1936, leading them through the season unbeaten against other schools and inflicting Eton's first loss to another school since 1920. He was awarded a scholarship to Oxford University, where he won Blues for both cricket and football, and was secretary of both clubs.

An opening batsman and fine fieldsman, Lomas had an outstanding first season with Oxford in 1938, scoring 908 runs at an average of 45.40. Troubled by ill-health in 1939 he was less successful, but nevertheless made his highest score of 138 against a strong MCC side at Lord's.

When the Second World War began Lomas enlisted in the Royal Navy Volunteer Reserve, but was invalided out in 1940 owing to illness. For a time he worked at the Admiralty, but his health again failed him and he returned to his studies at Oxford. He completed his law degree in 1945 and was made a fellow of New College, Oxford. However, with his final bar exams approaching, Lomas gassed himself in December 1945. The cricket writer R. C. Robertson-Glasgow, an admirer of Lomas's batting, observed that "the current of his thought and ambitions ran deep out of the sight of common day and common intercourse".

He was a close friend of the mathematician G. H. Hardy, a cricket lover, who dedicated A Mathematician's Apology to Lomas with an inscription explaining that Lomas had asked him to write the work.

References

External links

 John Lomas at Cricket Archive

1917 births
1945 suicides
People from Ashtead
People educated at Charterhouse School
Alumni of New College, Oxford
English cricketers
Oxford University cricketers
Suicides in Westminster
Royal Naval Volunteer Reserve personnel of World War II
Suicides by gas
1945 deaths
Admiralty personnel of World War II